Imaginary may refer to:

 Imaginary (sociology), a concept in sociology
 The Imaginary (psychoanalysis), a concept by Jacques Lacan
 Imaginary number, a concept in mathematics
 Imaginary time, a concept in physics
 Imagination, a mental faculty
 Object of the mind, an object of the imagination
 Imaginary friend

Music
 Imaginary Records, a record label
 "Imaginary", a song by Evanescence from Fallen
 "Imaginary", a song by Imran Khan best video and best song Pakistani Music and Media Awards (PMMA)
 "Imaginary", a song by Peace from Happy People
 "Imaginary", a song by Brennan Heart with Jonathan Mendelsohn

Other
 The Imaginary (Sartre), a 1940 philosophical work by Jean-Paul Sartre
 Imaginary (exhibition), a mathematical art exhibition by the Mathematisches Forschungsinstitut Oberwolfach

See also 
 The Imaginary (disambiguation)
 Imagination (disambiguation)
 Imagine (disambiguation)